Ruti-Nina Brosh-Vic (born November 12, 1975) is an Israeli model and actress.

During the 1990s, she led campaigns for brands such as Givenchy, Yves Saint Laurent, Dolce & Gabbana,  Chanel, Dior, DKNY, Bebe and Miu Miu. In the 1990s, she appeared on the covers of magazines such as Vogue and Elle.

Early life 
Ruti-Nina Brosh-Vic was born in Ramat Yishai, Israel, to a father of Russian-Jewish descent, and to a Jewish mother who was born in  China. On her father's side, she is a great-great-granddaughter of Rabbi Yehuda Leib Maimon. She was named Nina after her grandmother.

Modelling 
During the 1990s, she led campaigns for brands such as Givenchy, Yves Saint Laurent, Dolce & Gabbana, DKNY, Chanel, Dior, Bebe and Miu Miu.

Acting 
She starred in Duran Duran's "Femme Fatale" music video.  In 1998 she appeared opposite Vincent Gallo in the independent movie Johnny 316.

References

External links 

Nina Brosh fan gallery (warning: contains some adult material)

1975 births
Living people
Israeli female models
Israeli film actresses
People of Chinese-Jewish descent
Israeli people of Russian-Jewish descent
Israeli Ashkenazi Jews
20th-century Israeli actresses
People from Ramat Yishay